Pete Shinnick (born May 15, 1965) is an American football coach and former player. He is the head football coach at the Towson University in Towson, Maryland. As the head coach of West Florida, Shinnick won the school's first football national championship in 2019.  The football team began play in 2016.  2017 was a big year for Shinnick, as he led the University of West Florida Agronauts to the NCAA Division II playoffs, making them the fastest team to do so (two years). He broke the record he held at the University of North Carolina at Pembroke, that being three years. Shinnick also won the 2017 AFCA Region 2 Coach of the Year. He later won the 2017 AFCA Division II Coach of the Year.  On December 21, 2019, Shinnick won the NCAA D-II National Championship with the UWF Argos in just the program's 4th year of existence.

Shinnick previously served as the head football at Azusa Pacific University from 1999 and 2005 and at the University of North Carolina at Pembroke from the program's inception until 2014. After leading Azusa Pacific to an overall record of 53–22, Shinnick was hired as UNC Pembroke's first head coach on December 13, 2005. Over seven seasons at Pembroke, Shinnick compiled an overall record of 50–24.

Coaching career

Azusa Pacific
Shinnick was the eighth head football coach at Azusa Pacific University in Azusa, California and he held that position for seven seasons, from 1999 until 2005, compiling a record of 53–22.

UNC Pembroke
In 2005, Shinnick was named the head coach at the University of North Carolina at Pembroke Braves, the first football coach at the school since the school discontinued the program in the 1950s.

West Florida
On January 31, 2014, the University of West Florida announced it had hired Shinnick as the head coach of its newly established football team, which began play in 2016. On November 12, 2017, the Argos had made the playoffs in only the second season, making them the fastest team in NCAA history to do so. They also went to the NCAA D-II National Championship game the same year, breaking another record.  On December 21, 2019, Shinnick won the NCAA D-II National Championship with the UWF Argos in just the program's 4th year of existence.

Towson
On December 11, 2022, Shinnick was hired to become the head football coach at Towson University.

Head coaching record

References

External links
 West Florida profile
 UNC Pembroke profile
  

1965 births
Living people
American football offensive guards
Arkansas Razorbacks football coaches
Azusa Pacific Cougars football coaches
Clemson Tigers football coaches
Colorado Buffaloes football players
Humboldt State Lumberjacks football coaches
Northern Michigan Wildcats football coaches
Oregon State Beavers football coaches
Richmond Spiders football coaches
St. Cloud State Huskies football coaches
Towson Tigers football coaches
UNC Pembroke Braves football coaches
West Florida Argonauts football coaches
Clemson University alumni